The Order of Merit is an order of merit for the Commonwealth realms, recognising distinguished service in the armed forces, science, art, literature, or for the promotion of culture. Established in 1902 by Edward VII, admission into the order remains the personal gift of its Sovereign—currently Edward VII's great-great-grandson, Charles III—and is restricted to a maximum of 24 living recipients from the Commonwealth realms, plus a limited number of honorary members. While all members are awarded the right to use the post-nominal letters OM and wear the badge of the order, the Order of Merit's precedence among other honours differs between countries.

History
In around 1773, George III considered establishing an order of knighthood to be called the "Order of Minerva" with membership restricted to 24 distinguished artists and authors. Knights would be entitled to the post-nominal letters KM, and would wear a silver nine-pointed breast star with the image of Minerva at its centre, along with a "straw-coloured" sash worn across the chest from the right shoulder. The motto of the Order would be "Omnia posthabita scientiae" (in Latin, 'Everything comes after science'). Once the King's proposal was made public, however, arguments within intellectual circles over who would be most deserving of the new order grew so heated that George ultimately dropped the idea, though he briefly reconsidered it in 1789; on 6 February of that year, he revised the design of the order, with the breast star to have sixteen points, the motto to be the Latin for "Learning improves character" and with membership to include distinguished scientists. Following the Battle of Trafalgar in 1805, First Lord of the Admiralty Lord Barham and William Pitt exchanged correspondence concerning the possible creation of an order of merit, though nothing came of the idea.

Later, Queen Victoria, her courtiers, and politicians alike, thought that a new order, based on the Prussian order Pour le Mérite, would make up for the insufficient recognition offered by the established honours system to achievement outside of public service, in fields such as art, music, literature, industry, and science. Victoria's husband, Albert, Prince Consort, took an interest in the matter; it was recorded in his diary that he met Sir Robert Peel on 16 January 1844 to discuss the "idea of institution of a civil Order of Merit" and, three days later, he conferred with the Queen on the subject. The concept did not wither and, on 5 January 1888, British prime minister Lord Salisbury submitted to the Queen a draft constitution for an Order of Merit in Science and Art, consisting of one grade split into two branches of knighthood: the Order of Scientific Merit for Knights of Merit in Science, with the post-nominal letters KMS, and the Order of Artistic Merit for Knights of Merit in Art, with the post-nominal letters KMA. However, Sir Frederic Leighton, President of the Royal Academy, advised against the new order, primarily because of its selection process.

Victoria's son, Edward VII, eventually founded the Order of Merit on 26 June 1902 (the date for which his coronation had been originally planned) as a means to acknowledge "exceptionally meritorious service in Our Navy and Our Army, or who may have rendered exceptionally meritorious service towards the advancement of Art, Literature and Science". All modern aspects of the order were established under his direction, including the division for military figures.

From the outset, prime ministers attempted to propose candidates or lobbied to influence the monarch's decision on appointments, but the Royal Household adamantly guarded information about potential names. After 1931, when the Statute of Westminster came into being and the Dominions of the British Empire became independent countries, equal in status to the UK, the Order of Merit continued as an honour open to all these realms and, in many, became a part of their national honours systems. The order's statutes were amended in 1935 to include members of the Royal Air Force and, in 1969, the definition of honorary recipients was expanded to include members of the Commonwealth of Nations that are not realms.

From its inception, the order has been open to women, Florence Nightingale being the first woman to receive the honour, in 1907. Several individuals have refused admission into the Order of Merit, including Rudyard Kipling, A. E. Housman, and George Bernard Shaw. To date, Prince Philip, Duke of Edinburgh, remains the youngest person ever inducted into the Order of Merit, having been admitted by Queen Elizabeth II in 1968, when he was 47 years of age.

Eligibility and appointment
All citizens of the Commonwealth realms are eligible for appointment to the Order of Merit. There may be, however, only 24 living individuals in the order at any given time, not including honorary appointees, and new members are personally selected by the reigning monarch of the realms, currently Charles III, with the assistance of his private secretaries; the order has thus been described as "quite possibly, the most prestigious honour one can receive on planet Earth." Within the limited membership is a designated military division, with its own unique insignia; though it has not been abolished, it is currently unpopulated, Lord Mountbatten of Burma having been the last person so honoured. 

Honorary members form another group, to which there is no numerical limit, though such appointments are rare; individuals from countries in the Commonwealth of Nations that are not headed by King Charles are therefore considered foreigners, and thus are granted only honorary admissions, such as Nelson Mandela (South Africa) and Mother Teresa (India).

Upon admission into the Order of Merit, members are entitled to use the post-nominal letters OM and are entrusted with the badge of the order.

Insignia

The insignia consists of a badge, which consists of a golden crown from which is suspended a red enamelled cross pattée, itself centred by a disk of blue enamel, surrounded by a laurel wreath. The obverse of the badge's central disk bears the words FOR MERIT in gold lettering, while the reverse bears the royal cypher of the reigning monarch in gold. The insignia for the military grouping is distinguished by a pair of crossed swords behind the central disk.

The ribbon of the Order of Merit is divided into two stripes of red and blue. Men wear their badges on a neck ribbon (as a necklet), while women wear theirs on a ribbon bow pinned to the left shoulder, and aides-de-camp may wear the insignia on their aiguillettes. 

Since 1991, it has been required that the insignia be returned upon the recipient's death.

Current members

 Sovereign: Charles III
 Secretary and Registrar: The Lord Janvrin

Substantive members

Honorary members
There have been no honorary members of the Order of Merit since the death of the last such member, Nelson Mandela, in December 2013.

Precedence
As the Order of Merit is open to the citizens of 15 countries, each with their own system of orders, decorations, and medals, the order's place of precedence varies from country to country. While, in the United Kingdom, the order's postnominal letters follow those of Knights and Dames Grand Cross of the Order of the Bath, membership in the Order of Merit itself gives members no place in any of the orders of precedence in the United Kingdom. However, Stanley Martin says in his book The Order of Merit 1902–2002: One Hundred Years of Matchless Honour, that the Order of Merit is the pinnacle of the British honours system. Similarly, though it was not listed in the Canadian order of precedence for honours, decorations, and medals until December 2010, Christopher McCreery, an expert on Canadian honours and secretary to the Lieutenant Governor of Nova Scotia, stated that the Order of Merit was the highest civilian award for merit a Canadian could receive.

Some orders of precedence are as follows:

Notes

Citations

References

External links

 Order of Merit (cabinetoffice.gov.uk)
 What is the Order of Merit? (thegazette.co.uk)
 
 
 World Awards

Civil awards and decorations of Canada
Civil awards and decorations of the United Kingdom
Awards established in 1902
 
1902 establishments in the British Empire